Mang Hoi (born 1 May 1958) is an actor from Hong Kong. He won the Best Supporting Actor at the 5th Hong Kong Film Awards.

Selected filmography

The Price of Love (1970)
Pursuit (1972) - Little Helper
The Young Avenger (1972) 
The Human Goddess (1972)
Fist of Unicorn (1973) - Hsiao-Hu (Guest star)
Enter the Dragon (1973, cameo) - Ship's mate (uncredited)
Death Blow (1973) - Theater Kid
Honor and Love (1973)
Iron Bull (1973)
Call me Dragon (1974) - Siu Gam's Sidekick
Godfather Squad (1974) - Wang's little brother
Bruce Lee, D-Day at Macao (1974) - Little Monkey
The Silent Guest of Pecking (1975)
Challenge of the Masters (1976)
Kidnap in Rome (1976)
The Iron Fisted Monk (1976)
Executioners from Shaolin (1977) - Shaolin Pupil (uncredited)
Shaolin Plot (1977) - assassin beggar (cameo)
The Fatal Flying Guillotines (1977)
Strife of Mastery (1977)
Deadly Chase for Justice (1977)
Fist of Dragon (1977)
He Has Nothing But Kung Fu (1977)
Enter the Fat Dragon (1978) - Fighter in Opening Credit Sequence
Mysterious Footworks of Kung Fu (1978) - Minor Role
Dirty Tiger, Crazy Frog (1978) - Casino thug (extra)
Kung Fu Means Fists, Strikes and Sword (1978) - Minor Role
Gee and Gor (1978)
Amsterdam Connection (1978) - Tung's Henchman
Heaven Sword and Dragon Sabre, Part 2 (1978) - Yuan's Guard
Warriors Two (1978) - Twin Sword Fighter
The Incredible Kung Fu Master (1979) - Hoi
Hell's Wind Staff (1979) - Shih Hai Lung
Way of the Black Dragon (1979) - Thug (extra)
The Fearless Hyena (1979, extra / stunts)
Kung Fu Vs. Yoga (1979, action director)
Death Duel of Kung Fu (1979, action director)
The Buddha Assassinator (1979) - Hsiao Hai
Kung Fu Fever (1979, action director)
Wonderman From Shaolin (1979) - assistant action director
The Star, the Rogue & the Kung Fu Kid (1980) - Shao
The Ring of Death (1980, action director)
Hitman in the Hand of Buddha (1981, action director)
Ninja in the Dragon's Den (1982, action director)
Dragon Lord (1982) - Lu Chen gang member
The Shaolin Drunken Monk (1982, assistant action director)
Zu: Warriors from the Magic Mountain (1983) - Yi Chen
Double Trouble (1984)
Twinkle, Twinkle Lucky Stars (1985) - Person at the end
For Your Heart Only (1985) - Sapi
Heart of the Dragon (1985, action director) - Yan
Yes, Madam! (1985) - Aspirin
Dragon Against Vampire (1985, action director)
Righting Wrongs (1986, action director)
Legacy of Rage (1986, action director) - Four Eyes/Hoi
No Retreat, No Surrender (1986, action director)
Millionaires Express (1986) - Bank Robber
Where's Officer Tuba? (1986)
My Cousin the Ghost (1987) - Q
Keep on Dancing (1988) - Ship Thug (uncredited)
Gai juk tiu mo (1988)
Pedicab Driver (1989) - Rice Pudding
Lady Reporter (1989) - Shorty
Encounters of the Spooky Kind II (1990) - Little Hoi
The Blonde Fury (1989) - Hai
Shanghai Shanghai (1990) - Hai
The Nocturnal Demon (1990) - Delivering Uniforms 
Gambling Ghost (1991) - Siu Hon
The Tantana (1991) - Ah Hoi
Spiritually a Cop (1991)
City Hunter (1993) - Henchman ("Room service")
Ah Kam (1996) - Copy
97 Aces Go Places (1997) 
The Extra (1998) - Mahjong Player (cameo)
No Problem (1999) - Director
Perfect Education 3 (2002) - Faday
Osaka Wrestling Restaurant (2004) - Policeman (cameo)
Ip Man: The Final Fight (2013) - Chess Onlooker
Kung Fu Jungle (2014) - Human Gang Leader (final film role)

References

External links 
 

Hong Kong male actors
Living people
1958 births

zu:The Warriors from Magic Mountain